An industrial policy (IP) or industrial strategy of a country is its official strategic effort to encourage the development and growth of all or part of the economy, often focused on all or part of the manufacturing sector. The government takes measures "aimed at improving the competitiveness and capabilities of domestic firms and promoting structural transformation." A country's infrastructure (including transportation, telecommunications and energy industry) is a major enabler of the wider economy and so often has a key role in IP.

Industrial policies are interventionist measures typical of mixed economy countries.  Many types of industrial policies contain common elements with other types of interventionist practices such as trade policy. Industrial policy is usually seen as separate from broader macroeconomic policies, such as tightening credit and taxing capital gains. Traditional examples of industrial policy include subsidizing export industries and import-substitution-industrialization (ISI), where trade barriers are temporarily imposed on some key sectors, such as manufacturing. By selectively protecting certain industries, these industries are given time to learn (learning by doing) and upgrade. Once competitive enough, these restrictions are lifted to expose the selected industries to the international market. More contemporary industrial policies include measures such as support for linkages between firms and support for upstream technologies.

History 
The traditional arguments for industrial policies go back as far as the 18th century. Prominent early arguments in favor of selective protection of industries were contained in the 1791 Report on the Subject of Manufactures of US economist and politician Alexander Hamilton, as well as the work of German economist Friedrich List. List's views on free trade were in explicit contradiction to those of Adam Smith, who, in The Wealth of Nations, said that "the most advantageous method in which a landed nation can raise up artificers, manufacturers, and merchants of its own is to grant the most perfect freedom of trade to the artificers, manufacturers, and merchants of all other nations." The arguments of List and others were subsequently picked up by scholars of early development economics such as Albert Hirschman and Alexander Gerschenkron, who called for the selective promotion of key sectors in overcoming economic backwardness.

The relationship between government and industry in the United States has never been a simple one, and the labels used in categorizing these relationships at different times are often misleading if not false. In the early nineteenth century, for example, "it is quite clear that the laissez faire label is an inappropriate one." In the US, an industrial policy was explicitly presented for the first time by the Jimmy Carter administration in August 1980, but it was subsequently dismantled with the election of Ronald Reagan the following year.

Historically, there is a growing consensus that most developed countries, including United Kingdom, United States, Germany, and France, have intervened actively in their domestic economy through industrial policies. These early examples are followed by interventionist ISI strategies pursued in Latin American countries such as Brazil, Mexico or Argentina. More recently, the rapid growth of East Asian economies, or the newly industrialized countries (NICs), has also been associated with active industrial policies that selectively promoted manufacturing and facilitated technology transfer and industrial upgrading. The success of these state-directed industrialization strategies are often attributed to developmental states and strong bureaucracies such as the Japanese MITI. According to Princeton's Atul Kohli, the reason Japanese colonies such as South Korea developed so rapidly and successfully was down to Japan exporting to its colonies the same centralised state development that it had used to develop itself. Precisely speaking, South Korea's development can be explained by the fact that it followed the similar industrial policies that UK, US and Germany implemented, and South Korea adopted Export-Oriented Industrialization (EOI) policy from 1964 based on its own decision contrary to the Import Substitution Industrialization (ISI) policy touted by international aid organizations and experts at that time. Many of these domestic policy choices, however, are now seen as detrimental to free trade and are hence limited by various international agreements such as WTO TRIMs or TRIPS. Instead, the recent focus for industrial policy has shifted towards the promotion of local business clusters and the integration into global value chains.

During the Reagan administration, an economic development initiative called Project Socrates was initiated to address US decline in ability to compete in world markets.  Project Socrates, directed by Michael Sekora, resulted in a computer-based competitive strategy system that was made available to private industry and all other public and private institutions that impact economic growth, competitiveness and trade policy.  A key objective of Socrates was to utilize advanced technology to enable US private institutions and public agencies to cooperate in the development and execution of competitive strategies without violating existing laws or compromising the spirit of "free market".   President Reagan was satisfied that this objective was fulfilled in the Socrates system.  Through the advances of innovation age technology, Socrates would provide "voluntary" but "systematic" coordination of resources across multiple "economic system" institutions including industry clusters, financial service organizations, university research facilities and government economic planning agencies.  While the view of one US President and the Socrates team was that technology made it virtually possible for both to exist simultaneously, the industrial policy vs. free market debate continued as later under the George H. W. Bush administration, Socrates was labeled as industrial policy and de-funded.

Following the Financial Crisis of 2007–08, many countries around the world  – including the US, UK, Australia, Japan and most countries of the European Union – have adopted industry policies. However contemporary industry policy generally accepts globalization as a given, and focuses less on the decline of older industries, and more on the growth of emergent industries. It often involves government working collaboratively with industry to respond to challenges and opportunities. China is a prominent case where the central and subnational governments participate in nearly all economic sectors and processes. Even though market mechanisms have gained in importance, state guidance through state-directed investment and indicative planning plays a substantial role in the economy. In order to catch-up and even overtake industrialized countries technologically, China's "state activities even extend to efforts to prevent the dominance of foreign investors and technologies in areas considered to be of key significance such as the strategic industries and the new technologies" including robotics and new energy vehicles.

Criticism 
The main criticism against industrial policy arises from the concept of government failure. Industrial policy is seen as harmful as governments lack the required information, capabilities and incentives to successfully determine whether the benefits of promoting certain sectors above others exceeds the costs and in turn implement the policies. While the East Asian Tigers provided successful examples of heterodox interventions and protectionist industrial policies, industrial policies such as import-substitution-industrialization (ISI) have failed in many other regions such as Latin America and Sub-Saharan Africa. Governments, in making decisions with regard to electoral or personal incentives, can be captured by vested interests, leading to industrial policies supporting local rent-seeking political elites while distorting the efficient allocation of resources by market forces.

Debates on process 
Despite criticism, there is a consensus in recent development theory that says state interventions may be necessary when market failures occur. Market failures often exist in the form of externalities and natural monopolies. Such market failures may hinder the emergence of a well-functioning market and corrective industrial policies are required to ensure the allocative efficiency of a free market. Even relatively-skeptical economists now recognize that public action can boost certain development factors "beyond what market forces on their own would generate." In practice, these interventions are often aimed at regulating networks, public infrastructure, R&D or correcting information asymmetries. Many countries are now seeing a revival of industrial policy.

One question is which kinds of industrial policy are most effective in promoting economic development. For example, economists debate whether developing countries should focus on their comparative advantage by promoting mostly resource- and labor-intensive products and services, or invest in higher-productivity industries, which may only become competitive in the longer term. 

Debate also surrounds the issue of whether government failures are more pervasive and severe than market failures. Some argue that the lower the government accountability and capabilities, the higher the risk of political capture of industrial policies, which may be economically more harmful than existing market failures.

Of particular relevance for developing countries are the conditions under which industrial policies may also contribute to poverty reduction, such as a focus on specific industries or the promotion of linkages between larger companies and smaller local enterprises.

See also 
 Green industrial policy
 Chaebol
 Developmental state
 Import substitution industrialization
 Infant industry argument
 Ministry of International Trade and Industry
 The Lucas Plan

References

Sources 

 
 
 
 
 
 
 Dobbin, Frank. Forging Industrial Policy: The United States, Britain and France in the Railway Age. Cambridge: Cambridge University Press 1994
 
 
 
 
 
 
 
 
 Koh, Jae Myong (2018). Green Infrastructure Financing: Institutional Investors, PPPs and Bankable Projects, London: Palgrave Macmillan. .

External links 
 New Industrial and Innovation Policy, The World Bank Institute
 China's Political System, Mercator Institute for China Studies
 Interview with US secretary of commerce Penny Pritzke by the McKinsey Global Institute

 
Policy